Marine camouflage may refer to:

 Underwater camouflage in marine animals, by any of a variety of methods
 Ship camouflage, including dazzle camouflage and disruptive camouflage
 MARPAT, a printed digital camouflage pattern used by United States Marines